Albert Victor 'Abe' Watson (11 June 1871 – 29 November 1932) was an Australian rules footballer who played with Essendon in the Victorian Football League (VFL).

He joined the 51st Battalion during World War I and was captured as a prisoner of war during the Battle of Mouquet Farm.

Notes

External links 

Essendon Football Club players
Australian rules footballers from Victoria (Australia)
1871 births
1932 deaths
Australian military personnel of World War I